is a Japanese actor represented by Alpha Agency. His father is actor Akira Emoto, his mother is actress Kazue Tsunogae, his brother is actor Tokio Emoto, and his wife is actress Sakura Ando.

Biography
Emoto was born in Tokyo on 1986. In 2001 he was a student for Wako High School.

Later in the year Emoto passed the audition for the film Utsukushī Natsu Kirishima. He debuted in the film as the protagonist Yasuo Hidaka in 2003. This started Emoto's acting career. In 2004 he was awarded the 77th Kinema Junpo Award for Best Newcomer and the 13th Japanese Movie Critics Rookie Award for his role.

In 2005 Emoto went to the video department at Waseda University Art School. In March 2012 he married actress Sakura Ando.

Filmography

TV series

Film

Television animation

Dubbing
The Bears' Famous Invasion of Sicily (Gedeone)

References

External links
 

1986 births
Living people
Male actors from Tokyo